The New Adventures of the Elusive Avengers (translit. Novye prikluchenya Neulovimykh) is a 1968 Soviet action film, a sequel of The Elusive Avengers, directed by Edmond Keosayan and made on Mosfilm. The film was followed by The Crown of the Russian Empire, or Once Again the Elusive Avengers released in 1971.

Plot
The film continues the story of the Elusive Avengers, a posse of young Red Partisans, including Valerka, a former schoolboy, Yashka, a devil-may-care gypsy, and two orphan siblings, Danka and his sister Ksanka. They join the Red Army and fight Baron Wrangel's White Guards. They intercept an airplane that was carrying a letter to the Baron. The letter reveals that the map of fortifications in Crimea is in possession of the White counter-intelligence officer, Colonel Kudasov. This map is vital for the Red Army assault, and the Avengers are sent on a secret mission to steal the map.

They enter Sevastopol on a fishing boat and disguise themselves. Danka assumes the guise of a shoe cleaner, and Valerka fashions himself as a young monarchist nobleman. Meanwhile, the Red agent they were sent to is arrested by Kudasov and killed when he tries to escape, leaving the Avengers on their own.

Ksanka meets Bubba Castorsky, a popular singer and dancer who helped the Avengers in the first film, and Bubba tells them about a White officer who probably knows the combination for Kudasov's safe. Valerka visits the cabaret often visited by this officer, captain Ovechkin, and befriends him. But Danka is arrested, because Ataman Burnash comes to the city and recognizes him. Yashka meets the local Gypsies and persuades them to help freeing Danka.

Then Captain Ovechkin recognizes Valerka for what he is, gloats at him and tells him the combination, intending to arrest him immediately, but Valerka detonates a pool ball filled with explosives and escapes. He dashes to the Counterintelligence Service headquarters, infiltrates it and steals the map. The headquarters is surrounded by soldiers, but Danka, Yashka and Ksanka distract the soldiers and let him escape with the map. The Avengers, along with Bubba, flee the city, but a White officer shoots Bubba when they are already escaping on a boat.

Cast
 Mikhail Metyolkin – Valerka Meshcheryakov
 Vasily Vasilyev – Yashka the Gypsy
 Viktor Kosykh – Danka Shchus
 Valentina Kurdyukova – Ksanka Shchus
 Armen Dzhigarkhanyan – captain Pyotr Sergeyevich Ovechkin
 Boris Sichkin – Buba Kastorsky, actor and singer
 Arkady Tolbuzin – colonel Leopold Sergeyevich Kudasov
 Vladimir Ivashov – lieutenant Perov, Kudasov's adjutant
 Yefim Kopelyan – chieftain Ignat Burnash
 Konstantin Sorokin – Mefody Kuzmich, carousel owner
 Ivan Pereverzev – Smirnov, chief of staff of Red Cavalry Army
 Nikolay Fedortsov – Andrei, underground fighter
 Yevgeny Vesnik – drunk colonel
 Sergey Filippov – Koshkin, apothecary, expert on explosions
 Savely Kramarov – Ilyukha Verekhov, cross-eyed convoy, former bandit
 Eduard Abalov – episode
 Yan Frenkel – violinist (uncredited)

External links

1968 films
Mosfilm films
Films set in Ukraine
Ostern films
Russian Civil War films
1960s Russian-language films
1960s action comedy films
Soviet action comedy films
Films directed by Edmond Keosayan
Russian sequel films
1968 comedy films
Soviet teen films